Knut Hauge (31 May 1911 – 13 April 1999) was a Norwegian writer.

Hauge was born at Vestre Slidre  in Oppland, Norway. He operated a farm in addition to writing a series of novels, children's books and plays. He also chaired the cultural society Noregs Ungdomslag from 1955 to 1959.

His first novel was Krossen under Torfinnshø in 1948, and his last novel was Prolog til ei svunnen tid in 1989. In 1965, Hauge won the Sunnmørsprisen  for his novel, Kross og kvitsymre. He was awarded the  Mads Wiel Nygaard's Endowment (Mads Wiel Nygaards legat) in 1967,  Aschehoug Prize (Aschehougprisen) in 1977 and  Dobloug Prize (Doblougprisen) in 1986.

Knut Hauge died during 1999. A bust of Hauge was installed at the  Valdres Folkemuseum at  Nord-Aurdal in  Oppland during 2007. The sculpture was designed by artist Laila Olava Unhjem and Knut Olav Dokken from Vestre Slidre.

Selected works
Ulfssønene (1969)  
Tidevatn (1971)  
Spelemann Siljufløyt (1973) 
Einsame ulvar (1975)
 Juvet (1978) 
Enno ein vår (1980)

References

1911 births
1999 deaths
People from Vestre Slidre
Norwegian male short story writers
Norwegian children's writers
20th-century novelists
20th-century Norwegian dramatists and playwrights
20th-century Norwegian novelists
20th-century Norwegian short story writers
20th-century Norwegian male writers
Norwegian male novelists
Norwegian male dramatists and playwrights